The Amanitaceae is a family of mushroom-forming fungi. Amanita Pers. is one of the most specious and best-known fungal genera. The family, also commonly called the amanita family, is in order Agaricales, the gilled mushrooms.  The family consists primarily of the large genus Amanita, but also includes the smaller genera Amarrendia, Catatrama, Limacella, Limacellopsis, Saproamanita, Torrendia and Zhuliangomyces. Both Amarrendia and Torrendia are considered to be synonymous with Amanita but appear quite different because they are secotioid.

The species are usually found in woodlands.  The most characteristic emerge from an egg-like structure formed by the universal veil.

This family contains several species valued for edibility and flavor, and other deadly poisonous ones.  More than half the cases of mushroom poisoning stem from members of this family.  The most toxic members of this group have names that warn of the poisonous nature, but others, of varying degrees of toxicity, do not.

Some notable species
 Amanita caesarea, Caesar's mushroom
 Amanita muscaria, fly agaric 
 Amanita rubescens, blusher 
 Amanita pantherina, panther cap 
 Amanita phalloides, death cap. 
 Amanita velosa, orange spring amanita. 
 Amanita virosa, destroying angel 
 Limacella bangladeshana, first limacella in Bangladesh
 Limacella solidipes, ringed limacella

See also
List of Agaricales families
List of Amanita species
List of Basidiomycota families

References

External links 
 Amanita studies site with 510+ taxa treated

 
Amanitaceae